Wallace Norman Rehfuss (November 27, 1876 – November 5, 1929) was a physician and political figure in Nova Scotia. He represented Lunenburg County in the Nova Scotia House of Assembly from 1925 to 1928 as a Liberal-Conservative member.

Early life and education
He was born in Conquerall Bank, Lunenburg County, Nova Scotia, the son of Philip Edward Rehfuss and Emma Elizabeth Ernst. Rehfuss was educated at the University of Pennsylvania and McGill University.

Career
Rehfuss served as a member of the town council for Bridgewater. He was a member of the province's Executive Council from 1925 to 1928. Rehfuss served as president of the Canadian Medical Association. He helped establish the Dawson Memorial Hospital in Bridgewater and served as chairman of its board of governors.

Death
Rehfuss died in Bridgewater at the age of 52.

Personal life
In 1906, he married Pauline DeWolfe Marshall.

References 
 A Directory of the Members of the Legislative Assembly of Nova Scotia, 1758-1958, Public Archives of Nova Scotia (1958)

1876 births
1929 deaths
Progressive Conservative Association of Nova Scotia MLAs
People from Lunenburg County, Nova Scotia
McGill University alumni
University of Pennsylvania alumni